NGC 5201 is a spiral galaxy located in the constellation Ursa Major. It was discovered on April 14, 1789 by German-born British astronomer William Herschel. It is about 384 million light years away.

References

External links
 
 

Ursa Major (constellation)
Spiral galaxies
Discoveries by William Herschel
Astronomical objects discovered in 1789
5201